Arturo Maly (September 6, 1939 – May 25, 2001) was a Silver Condor Award–winning Argentine actor.

He made over 50 appearances in film and television in Argentina between 1970 and his death in 2001 making his debut in the TV series Esta noche... miedo in 1970.

In 1981 he received a Silver Condor Award for Best New Actor for his work in the film Tiempo de revancha.

He appeared in acclaimed Argentine films such as La Aventura explosiva (1977), Alambrado (1991), Corazón iluminado (1996) and La Fuga in 2001.

Maly died on May 25, 2001, of a heart attack.

Filmography
 Fuga, La (2001) .... Pedro Escofet
 Campo de sangre (2001) .... Instruction Judge
 "Amor Latino" (2000) TV Series .... Leandro Villegas
 Los Pintin Al Rescate, Los (2000) (voice) .... Jorba Tarjat
 Cóndor Crux, la leyenda (2000) (voice) .... Phizar
 Operación Fangio (1999) .... Ambassador Quintana
 "Muñeca brava" (1998) TV Series .... Federico Di Carlo
 Inquietante caso de José Blum, El (1998) .... Dr. Hamán
 "El hombre de la bolsa" (1997 – cortometraje)
 Momentos robados (1997)
 "Signo, El" (1997) (mini) TV Series
 "Laberinto" (1997) TV Series .... Inspector Pujadas (unknown episodes)
 Corazón iluminado (1996)
 Geisha (1996) .... Commissar Arrieta
 Carlos Monzón, el segundo juicio (1996) .... Tonelli
 "Como pan caliente" (1996) TV Series
 "Último verano, El" (1996) TV Series
 "Nano" (1994) TV Series .... Noel Espada (unknown episodes)
 Cuatro caras para Victoria (1992)
 "Marie-Galante" (1992) (mini) TV Series
 Alambrado (1991) .... Harvey Logan
 "Celeste" (1991) TV Series .... Bruno Rosetti
 "Atreverse" .... Mario (1 episode)
 "Ave de Paso" (1988) TV Series
 The Stranger (1987) .... Father
 Memorias y olvidos (1987)
 Clínica del Dr. Cureta, La (1987)
 Cruz invertida, La (1985) .... Colonel
 Tacos altos (1985) .... Goon's Client
 Días de junio, Los (1985) .... Jorge
 Caso Matías, El (1985)
 Contar hasta diez (1985) .... Pedro Vallejos
 Cuarteles de invierno (1984)
 Noches sin lunas ni soles (1984) .... Rubio Páez
 No habrá más penas ni olvido (1983) Funny Dirty Little War (USA)
 "Compromiso" (1983) TV Series .... Various
 Últimos días de la víctima (1982) .... Rodolfo Külpe
 Tiempo de revancha (1981) .... Dr. García Brown
 Travesuras de Cepillo, Las (1981)
 Discoteca del amor, La (1980) .... Dr. J. B.
 "Andrea Celeste" (1980) TV Series .... Carlos Irastua
 Playa del amor, La (1980) .... TV Director
 "Hombres en pugna" (1980) (mini) TV Series
 Este loco amor loco (1979)
 "Somos nosotros" (1979) TV Series .... Roberto
 "Profesión, ama de casa" (1979) TV Series .... Gerardo
 Mañana puedo morir (1979) (TV)
 Parte del león, La (1978) .... Mario
 La Aventura explosiva (1977)
 Gauchos judíos, Los (1975)
 Gente en Buenos Aires (1974)
 Repita con nosotros el siguiente ejercicio (1973)
 Hijos de Fierro, Los (1972)
 "Esta noche... miedo" (1970) TV Series

External links
 

1939 births
2001 deaths
Male actors from Buenos Aires
Argentine male film actors
Argentine male television actors
Burials at La Chacarita Cemetery
20th-century Argentine male actors